Nena die Band is a best-of album by German pop group Nena, released in 1991. The first track, "Lass mich dein Pirat sein", is a remix. The version of "99 Luftballons" here combines the original recording with a live recording.

Title
The dot (period) at the end, which is usually not included in titles, is emphasized with red on the album's cover. Furthermore, on the official Nena website, unlike other releases in catalogue, this particular album is consistently referred to as “Nena – Die Band.” (note the period again). This indicates the total end of the band's lifespan, in fact completed four years earlier. All subsequent releases under the name Nena, as well as previous album Wunder gescheh'n (1989), are solo albums of Nena Kerner.

Track listing

Tracks 12 and 15 recorded live in Offenbach on 2 April 1984. Tracks 13 and 14 recorded live in Hamburg on 26 March 1984.

The above track list represents the CD version of the album. LP edition omits "Ganz oben" and two of the four live tracks ("Unerkannt durchs Märchenland" and "Tanz auf dem Vulkan") but includes a very short 15-second track "Der Bus is' schon weg" (from ? (Fragezeichen), 1984).

References

External links
 

Nena albums
1991 compilation albums
German-language compilation albums
Epic Records compilation albums